The English Football League Championship, known simply as the Championship in England and  for sponsorship purposes as Sky Bet Championship, is the highest division of the English Football League (EFL) and second-highest overall in the English football league system after the Premier League, and is currently contested by 24 clubs.

Introduced for the 2004–05 season as the Football League Championship, the division is a rebrand of the former Football League First Division, which itself is a rebrand of the now-defunct Football League Second Division prior to the 1992 launch of the Premier League. The winning club of this division  each season receives the EFL Championship trophy, which was the previous trophy awarded to the winners of the English top-flight prior to the launch of the Premier League. As with other divisions of professional English football, Welsh clubs can be part of this division, thus making it a cross-border league.

Each season, the two top-finishing teams in the Championship are automatically promoted to the Premier League. The teams that finish the season in 3rd to 6th place enter a playoff tournament, with the winner also gaining promotion to the Premier League. The three lowest-finishing teams in the Championship are relegated to League One.

The Championship is the wealthiest non-top-flight football division in the world, the ninth-richest division in Europe, and the tenth best-attended division in world football (with the highest per-match attendance of any secondary league). Its average match attendance for the 2018–19 season was 20,181.

Barnsley have spent more seasons in this division than any other team, with Birmingham City currently holding the longest tenure in this division, only absent in the 2010–11 season. Barnsley became the first club to attain 1,000 wins in second-tier English league football with a 2–1 home victory over Coventry City on 3 January 2011 and also the first club to play 3,000 games in second-level English league football (W1028, D747, L1224).

History

Sunderland won the league in the first season since re-branding, with Wigan Athletic finishing second to win promotion to the top flight of English football for the first time in their history. They had only been elected to the Football League in 1987; playing in the fourth tier as recently as 1994 before their promotion. West Ham United won the first Championship play-off final that season, following a 1–0 victory over Preston North End at the Millennium Stadium in Cardiff. The 2004–05 season saw the division announce a total attendance (including postseason) of 9.8 million, the fourth-highest total attendance for a European football division, behind the Premier League (12.88 million), Spain's La Liga (11.57 million) and Germany's Bundesliga (10.92 million). Additionally, Millwall, competing in the inaugural Championship season, qualified for the UEFA Cup, only to lose in the first qualifying round. In the 2005–06 season, Reading broke the Football League points record for a season, finishing with 106 points, exceeding the record set by Sunderland in 1999.

Sunderland won their second Championship title in the 2006–07 season, after being relegated from the top division the previous season. On 4 May 2007, Leeds United became the first side since the re-branding of the division to enter administration; they were deducted 10 points and were relegated as a result. On 28 May 2007, Derby County won the first Championship play-off final at the new Wembley Stadium, beating West Bromwich Albion 1–0. West Brom would go on to win the Championship in the following season.

Burnley, who finished fifth in 2009, defeated Sheffield United to earn their first season in the newly-branded Premier League, last being in the Football League First Division in 1976.

On 30 September 2009, Coca-Cola announced they would end their sponsorship deal with the Football League, which began in 2004, at the end of the 2009–10 season. On 16 March 2010, npower were announced as the new title sponsors of the Football League, and from the start of the 2010–11 Football League season until the end of the 2012–13 season, the Football League Championship was known as the Npower Championship. Crystal Palace became the second Championship club to enter administration in 2010.

After winning the 2011 League Cup Final, Birmingham City became the first Championship club to compete in the group stage of the UEFA Cup/Europa League, finishing third in the group, only one point behind Portuguese club Braga. Birmingham City eventually finished fourth in the Championship that season, and would lose to fifth-place Blackpool in the play-off. Wigan Athletic became the second club to participate in the Europa League group stage after winning the 2013 FA Cup, only to accumulate one win and lose their last three group matches.

On 18 July 2013, UK bookmaker Sky Bet announced that they signed a five-year agreement to sponsor the league.

On 24 May 2014, the Championship play-off final between Derby County and Queens Park Rangers saw the highest crowd for any Championship fixture – 87,348 witnessed a Bobby Zamora stoppage time winner for QPR to win promotion for the London club.

For the 2016–17 season, the Football League was re-branded as the English Football League. The league had a cumulative attendance of more than 11 million – excluding play-off matches – with more than two million watching Newcastle United and Aston Villa home fixtures alone, both of whom had been relegated from the Premier League in the previous season. This was included in the highest crowds for the second to fourth tier in England since the 1958–59 season. Newcastle won the title in 2016-17, while Aston Villa finished 13th, eventually returning to the Premier League in 2019.

On 13 March 2020, Championship play was halted due to the COVID-19 pandemic, with a suspension lasting until 4 April. It was then extended to the end of April, with the league eventually restarting on 20 June. Leeds United were confirmed as champions on 17 July 2020, being promoted to the Premier League for the first time in 16 years.

Brentford, being in League Two in 2009 and gaining promotion to the Championship five years later, were promoted following a play-off victory against Swansea City on 29 May 2021, after losing the play-off to Fulham the previous year. On 29 May 2022, Nottingham Forest, having been in the Championship for 14 consecutive seasons, ended their 23-year absence from the top flight by beating Huddersfield Town in the play-off final, after being last in the league as late as round 8 of the 2021–22 season.

The EFL Championship took a four-week break in November and December 2022 for the winter World Cup.

League structure
The league comprises 24 teams. Over the course of a season, which runs annually from August to the following May (in 2022, the year of a World Cup break in November and December, the league started in July), each team plays twice against the others in the league, once at 'home' and once 'away', resulting in each team competing in 46 games in total. Three points are awarded for a win, one for a draw, and zero for a loss. The teams are ranked in the league table by points gained, then goal difference, then goals scored, and then their head-to-head record for that season (including away goals record). If two or more teams finish the season equal in all these respects, then teams are separated by alphabetical order, unless a promotion, relegation, or play-off place (see below) is at stake, when the teams are separated by a play-off game, though this improbable situation has never arisen in all the years the rule has existed.

At the end of the season, the top two teams and the winner of the Championship play-offs are promoted to the Premier League and the bottom three teams are relegated to Football League One. The Football League Championship play-offs is a knock-out competition for the teams finishing the season in third to sixth place with the winner being promoted to the Premier League. In the play-offs, the third-placed team plays against the sixth-placed team and the fourth-placed team plays against the fifth-placed team in two-legged semi-finals (home and away). The winners of each semi-final then compete in a single match at Wembley Stadium with the prize being promotion to the Premier League and the Championship play-off trophy.

Current members

The following 24 clubs will compete in the EFL Championship during the 2022–23 season.

Results

League champions, runners-up and play-off finalists

Relegated teams (from Championship to League One)

Relegated teams (from Premier League to Championship)

Promoted teams (from League One to Championship)

Top scorers

Attendances

The EFL Championship is the second most-watched second-tier domestic sports league in the World, behind the German 2. Bundesliga (20,372), with an average of 18,585 spectators per game in the 2019–20 season. The EFL Championship was the seventh most-watched domestic football league in Europe in 2019-20, behind the Premier League, Bundesliga (1 and 2), La Liga, Serie A and Ligue 1. In the 2016–17 season, the EFL Championship was the third most watched domestic league in Europe, behind the Premier League and the 1. Bundesliga.

The highest average league attendance was in 2017–18 season, when 11.3 million fans attended Championship matches, at an average of 20,489 per game. The lowest average league attendance came in the 2013–14 season, when 9.1 million spectators watched at an average of 16,605 per game. The highest seasonal average for a club was 51,106 for Newcastle United in the 2016–17 season.

Historic performance
Since the restructuring into the Championship in 2004, 56 teams have spent at least one season in the division, including 13 of the 20 teams in the 2022–23 Premier League. Cardiff City and Derby County have both spent the longest in the league with 17 seasons each. The 15-season spell for Ipswich Town between 2004 and 2019 is the longest consecutive spell of any team in the division. The team with the current longest tenure is Birmingham City, which has been a Championship team for eleven consecutive seasons. Norwich City has had six separate spells in the Championship; the most of any team. There have been 13 different winners of the EFL Championship, with five teams (Newcastle United, Sunderland, Wolverhampton Wanderers, Reading and Norwich City) having won it twice.

Norwich City has been promoted out of the Championship on four occasions, with five teams (Burnley, Fulham, Hull City, Watford, West Brom) having been promoted on three occasions. Rotherham United has been relegated from the Championship on four occasions, with three teams (Barnsley, Charlton Athletic and Wigan Athletic) having been relegated on three occasions. 14 teams have been both promoted out of and relegated from the Championship.

Key
   Teams with this background and symbol in the "Club" column will be competing in the 2022–23 EFL Championship 
   Team will be competing in the 2022–23 Premier League
  The club competed in the EFL Championship during that season (the number is the club's final league position)

See also
 English football league system
 EFL Championship Manager of the Month
 List of English football club owners
 List of attendance figures at domestic professional sports leagues – Championship attendance in a worldwide context
 List of professional sports teams in the United Kingdom

References

External links

 
  Championship Stadiums at WikiStadiums

EFL Championship
Football leagues in England
English Football League
2004 establishments in England
Second level football leagues in Europe
Sports leagues established in 2004
National championships in England
Professional sports leagues in the United Kingdom